Zachary Bogan (1625–1659) was an English scholar with Biblical interests. He published with the antiquarian Francis Rous the younger, and the alchemist Edmund Dickinson. He argued for parallels between Biblical and ancient Greek literature. He also wrote purely religious works, before dying young from consumption.

Life
He was born in Gatcomb, Devon,  and was a fellow of Corpus Christi College, Oxford.

Works
Bogan published Treatises on the Idioms of Homer and Hesiod, as compared with the Language of Scripture, and some devotional tracts. He collaborated with Francis Rous the younger on the work Archaeologiae Atticae Libri Septem (Seven books of the Attick Antiquities) in 1649.

He also co-authored some works with Thomas Godwyn and Francis Rous.

References

Notes

1625 births
1659 deaths
Writers from Devon
17th-century English theologians
English Christian theologians
Christian scholars
British biblical scholars